is a Japanese composer and arranger.  His hometown is Tokyo, Japan. He is a graduate of Tokyo National University of Fine Arts and Music.

Works

Anime
The Irresponsible Captain Tylor (OVA series (theme songs composition, etc.); 1995, 1996)
Now and Then, Here and There (1999)
Rurouni Kenshin: Trust & Betrayal (1999)
R.O.D -Read or Die- (2001)
The SoulTaker (2001)
Sadamitsu the Destroyer (2001)
Rurouni Kenshin: Reflection (2001)
Go! Go! Itsutsugo Land (2001)
GetBackers (2002)
Yokohama Kaidashi Kikō (2002)
Witch Hunter Robin (2002)
R.O.D the TV (2003)
Yakitate!! Japan (2004)
Black Cat (2005)
Angel Heart (2005)
Binchō-tan (2006)
Ōban Star-Racers (2006)
Kekkaishi (2006)
009-1 (2006)
Gurren Lagann (2007)
Persona: Trinity Soul (2008)
Soul Eater (2008)
Black Butler (2009)
Katanagatari (2010)
C (2011)
Heaven's Memo Pad (2011)
Ben-To (2011)
Jormungand (2012)
JoJo's Bizarre Adventure: Battle Tendency (2012)
Gatchaman Crowds (2013)
Noragami (2014)
The Irregular at Magic High School (2014)
Akame ga Kill! (2014)
Magic Kaito 1412 (2014)
Gatchaman Crowds insight (2015)
Noragami Aragoto (2015) with Kayo Konishi, Yukio Kondoo (MOKA☆) and ELECTROCUTICA
Bungo Stray Dogs (2016–23)
Qualidea Code (2016)
Ulysses: Jeanne d'Arc and the Alchemist Knight (2018)
Cop Craft (2019)
White Cat Project: Zero Chronicle (2020)
The Irregular at Magic High School: Visitor Arc (2020)
The Honor Student at Magic High School (2021)
The Irregular at Magic High School: Reminiscence Arc (2022)

Films
Origin: Spirits of the Past (2006)
The Irregular at Magic High School: The Movie – The Girl Who Summons the Stars (2017)
Bungo Stray Dogs: Dead Apple (2018)
L.O.R.D: Legend of Ravaging Dynasties 2 (2020)
Shin Kamen Rider (2023)

Games
Mercury - The Prime Master (1991) with Hayato Matsuo, Seirou Okamoto and Tsushi Yamaji
Aerobiz (1992)
Aerobiz Supersonic (1993)
Taikō Risshiden 2 (1995)
Soul Edge (1995)
Soul Edge Original Soundtrack - Khan Super Session (1996) (tracks 9, 13 and 15)
Ai Cho Aniki (1997)
Uncharted Waters Online (2004)
Muv-Luv Alternative (2006)
Final Fantasy XV: Episode Ardyn (2019)

References

External links
 

Discography at VGMdb

1968 births
Anime composers
Japanese composers
Japanese film score composers
Japanese male composers
Japanese male film score composers
Japanese male musicians
Japanese music arrangers
Living people
Musicians from Tokyo
Tokyo University of the Arts alumni
Video game composers